Francisco "Fran" Gámez López (born 27 July 1991) is a Spanish footballer who plays for Real Zaragoza. Mainly a right back, he can also play as a right winger.

Club career
Born in Sagunto, Valencian Community, Gámez was a CD Acero youth graduate. He made his first team debut in the 2010–11 season, in the regional leagues.

On 16 June 2013, Gámez signed for Tercera División side Atlético Saguntino. An undisputed starter, he scored a career-best 11 goals during the 2015–16 season, achieving promotion to Segunda División B; he also acted as team captain during the most of his spell.

On 30 January 2018, Gámez signed a two-and-a-half-year deal with RCD Mallorca also in the third division, after the club activated his € 30,000 buyout clause. He contributed with one goal in seven appearances, as his side achieved promotion to Segunda División after a one-year absence.

Gámez made his professional debut on 19 August 2018, starting in a 1–0 home win against CA Osasuna. He scored his first professional goal on 29 September, in a 1–1 away draw against CD Lugo, and finished the campaign as a starter as the club reached another promotion.

Gámez made his La Liga debut on 29 September 2019, starting in a 0–2 away loss against Deportivo Alavés. He lost his starting spot to Lumor Agbenyenu during the season as his side suffered relegation, and was also a backup option to Brian Oliván in 2020–21, as the club returned to the top tier.

On 15 July 2021, Gámez signed a two-year contract with Real Zaragoza in the second division.

References

External links

1991 births
Living people
People from Sagunto
Sportspeople from the Province of Valencia
Spanish footballers
Footballers from the Valencian Community
Association football defenders
La Liga players
Segunda División players
Segunda División B players
Tercera División players
Divisiones Regionales de Fútbol players
Atlético Saguntino players
RCD Mallorca players
Real Zaragoza players